Jane Elizabeth Hillston (born 1963) is British professor of Quantitative Modelling and Head of School in the School of Informatics, University of Edinburgh, Scotland.

Early life and education 
Hillston received a BA in Mathematics from the University of York in  1985, an MSc in Mathematics from Lehigh University in the United States in 1987 and a PhD in Computer Science from the University of Edinburgh in 1994, where she has spent her subsequent academic career. Her PhD thesis was awarded the BCS/CPHC Distinguished Dissertation Awards in 1995 and has been published by Cambridge University Press.

Research and career 
She has been an EPSRC Research Fellow (1994–1995), Lecturer (1995–2001), Reader (2001–2006) and Professor of Quantitative Modelling since 2006. Hillston is a member of the Laboratory for Foundations of Computer Science at Edinburgh. In 2018 she was appointed Head of the School of Informatics at Edinburgh, taking over from Johanna Moore.

Jane Hillston is known for her work on stochastic process algebras. In particular, she has developed the PEPA process algebra, and helped develop Bio-PEPA, which is based on the earlier PEPA algebra and is specifically aimed at analyzing biochemical networks.

Since January 1st 2023 Hillston has been Editor-in-Chief of Proceedings of the Royal Society A (the first female Editor-in-Chief in the journal's history). She also serves on the editorial board of Logical Methods in Computer Science; Elsevier Theoretical Computer Science, as one of the editors in the area of Theory of Natural Computing, and as an Associate Editor of ACM Transactions on Modeling and Computer Simulation (TOMACS).

Awards 
In 2004, she received the first Roger Needham Award at the Royal Society in London awarded yearly for a distinguished research contributor in computer research by a UK-based researcher within ten years of their PhD. In March 2007 she was elected to the fellowship of the Royal Society of Edinburgh. In 2018, Hillston was elected the membership of the Academia Europaea. In 2018 she was a recipient of the Suffrage Science Award for Computer Science. In 2021 she was awarded the RSE Lord Kelvin Medal.

She led the University of Edinburgh School of Informatics in applying for an Athena SWAN Award, which they subsequently achieved silver in. The award shows that the department provides a "supportive environment" for female students.

Hillston was elected a Fellow of the Royal Society in May 2022.

References

External links 
 Jane Hillston's home page
 Official web page
 LFCS web page
 

1963 births
Living people
British computer scientists
Formal methods people
Alumni of the University of York
Lehigh University alumni
Alumni of the University of Edinburgh
Academics of the University of Edinburgh
Fellows of the Royal Society
Fellows of the Royal Society of Edinburgh
Members of Academia Europaea
British women computer scientists